Henry II de Lorraine, 5th Duke of Guise (4 April 1614, in Paris – 2 June 1664, in Paris) was a French aristocrat and archbishop, the second son of Charles, Duke of Guise and Henriette Catherine de Joyeuse.

Life
At the age of fifteen, he became archbishop of Rheims. According to Gédéon Tallemant des Réaux, he had a well known affair with the actress Marguerite Béguin during this time period. The death of his eldest brother Francis in 1639 placed him in the dukedom the following year. He opposed Richelieu, and conspired with the count of Soissons, fighting in the Battle of La Marfée in 1641. For this, he was condemned to death, but fled to Brussels in 1641. His property was seized by the king in 1641, for crime of lèse-majesté. Reprieved, he returned in 1643 and his confiscated property was returned to him.

Hoping to make good his family's ancient pretensions to the Kingdom of Naples, he joined the revolt of Masaniello in 1647. The "Royal Republic of Naples" was declared, appealing to the protection of France and nominally headed by Guise (entitled doge in imitation of Venice). However, the tactless Guise rapidly alienated the Neapolitans, and wielded little influence with Cardinal Mazarin. He was captured by the Spaniards in 1648 when the republic fell, and held by them until 1652. He made a second attack on Naples in 1654, but it ended in failure, partly because of the presence of an English fleet under Robert Blake in support of the Spanish.

Afterwards, he settled in Paris, becoming Grand Chamberlain of France to Louis XIV and going deeply into debt because of his expenditures for horses and entertainments. He was the patron of Pierre Corneille, to whom he gave a lodging in the Hôtel de Guise.

Over the years two women laid claim to being his wife. The first was Anna Gonzaga later known as the "Princess Palatine," who in 1639 appears to have been duped into believing that a clandestine marriage ceremony was genuine. The second was a widow, Honorée de Berghes, Countess of Bossut, who claimed to have married him in Brussels on November 11, 1641. In March 1666 the Sacra Rota declared the marriage valid; but the King (and the House of Guise) refused to recognize the decision, thereby preventing Mme de Bossut from receiving any of the late Duke's vast fortune.

Anna Gonzaga described Duke Henry's "good and bad qualities" as follows:
Monsieur Guise had the figure, the air and the manners of a hero in a novel, and his entire life bore the mark this character. Magnificence reigned in his entire person and in everything that surrounded him; his conversation was especially charming: everything he said, everything he did, proclaimed that he was an extraordinary man. Ambition and love dominated his projects, which were so vast that they were Homeric; but with such an illustrious name, heroic valor, and a bit of good fortune, nothing exceeded his hopes. He had a gift for making himself loved by all those he wanted to please, which seemed to be the lot of the princes of the House of Lorraine. He was flighty in his attachments, inconstant in his projects, hasty in carrying things out.
He died in Paris on 2 June 1664 and was succeeded by his nephew Louis Joseph de Lorraine.

Notes

References

Sources

1614 births
1664 deaths
Counts of Eu
105
Princes of Joinville
Archbishops of Reims
17th-century Roman Catholic archbishops in France
Grand Chamberlains of France
Henri
17th-century peers of France
Man in the Iron Mask